The San Simeon slender salamander (Batrachoseps incognitus) is a species of salamander in the family Plethodontidae.

Distribution
The San Simeon slender salamander is endemic to California, in south-western Monterey and northern San Luis Obispo Counties in the western United States.

References

External links

Batrachoseps
Salamander
Salamander
Fauna of the California chaparral and woodlands
Natural history of the California Coast Ranges
Natural history of Monterey County, California
Natural history of San Luis Obispo County, California
Monterey Ranger District, Los Padres National Forest

Taxonomy articles created by Polbot
Amphibians described in 2001